Ibrahim Matola is a Liberal Politician Born (2 March 1972) Currently serving as Minister of Energy in the Office and Cabinet of Malawi. Matola previously was serving as the Chairman of the southern Region water board after being appointed by the President.

National assembly
As the leader of the UDF in the National Assembly, Matola has criticized the government for ignoring the concerns of the minority parties. Though the UDF was the governing party from 1994 to 2004, it currently the second largest opposition party with only fifteen out of the one hundred ninety four seats in the National Assembly. He has expressed concern that Malawi is returning to a one–party system. He has been vocally critical of the leadership of the majority Democratic Progressive Party, accusing them of "raping the country". During some particularly contentious debates, such as the debate regarding whether to change the Flag of Malawi, Matola has participated in walkouts of minority party members.

During debates in the National Assembly he has clashed with George Chaponda. Matola has criticized Chaponda's record while serving with the UDP.

He has traveled to the European Parliament in Brussels and to the Parliament of the United Kingdom in Westminster for the International Parliamentary Seminar.

Political positions
Matola has advocated for the rights of farmers in Malawi. He has also raised concerns that the Freedom of the Press in Malawi is being threatened.

Matola has repeatedly clashed with the national chairman of the UDF, Friday Jumbe. He led the UDF legislatures in a vote of no confidence in Jumbe and the election of George Nga Ntafu to replace him.

Matola has also attacked the 2011 Local Courts bill, arguing that it would provide too much power to local chiefs and could devolve into a "draconian system".

References

United Democratic Front (Malawi) politicians
Living people
Members of the National Assembly (Malawi)
1972 births